Sun Yu (March 21, 1900 – July 11, 1990) was a major leftist film director active in the 1930s in Shanghai. One of the core directors of the Lianhua Film Company, Sun Yu made a name for himself with a series of socially conscious dramas in the early to mid-1930s. After the Japanese invasion of China in 1937, Sun Yu made his way to the interior, where he continued to make films glorifying the war effort against the Japanese.

His career took a turn for the worse after the Communist victory in 1949. In The Life of Wu Xun, Sun Yu's big-budget biographical picture of the titular Qing Dynasty educator, Sun attracted the wrath of Mao Zedong, who personally criticized the film in an essay. Though Sun never fully recovered from the episode, he has regained his reputation as one of the foremost filmmakers of the golden age of Chinese cinema.

Besides his work in cinematography, Sun Yu is known as a poet and translator, with two translations of Li Po's poems appearing in Poetry magazine in 1926, and a full-length book of selected Li Po poems with translations and commentary appearing in 1982.

Sun Yu's films Playthings (Little Toys) (1933), Daybreak (1933), Sports Queen (1934), and The Great Road (The Big Road) (1934) are available with English subtitles on YouTube.

Biography
Sun Yu was born in the city of Chongqing and educated first at Tsinghua University in Beijing before continuing his education in drama at the University of Wisconsin–Madison.

After taking his degree in 1925, Sun enrolled at the New York Institute of Photography, where his courses included cinematography and film editing.  He also took evening courses at Columbia University in screenwriting and other, related courses.  During this time he also audited a series of lectures on writing for the theater given by David Belasco which influenced him greatly.

Upon returning to China in the summer of 1926, Sun Yu directed his first film, A Romantic Swordsman, with the faltering Minxin Film Company. Beginning in the 1930s, Sun Yu began a collaboration with the leftist film studio, Lianhua, where he became one of the core group of "socially conscious" directors along with Cai Chusheng, Fei Mu, and others. While with Lianhua, Sun directed some of his most lasting works, including Wild Rose (1932), Loving Blood of the Volcano (1932), Daybreak (1933), Little Toys (1933), and The Big Road (1934).

With the outbreak of the full-fledged war with Japan in 1937, Sun, like many of his colleagues, fled to the interior to the Nationalist wartime capital of Chongqing where he directed several propaganda films praising the war effort.

Upon the end of the war, Sun Yu began preparing for his most important production yet, a biographical epic of the Qing Dynasty educator, Wu Xun, who spread literacy among the common people. Sun's last major work, The Life of Wu Xun was made with the Kunlun Film Company and starred one of the top actors of the day, Zhao Dan, in the titular role. Shortly after its release, however, The Life of Wu Xun was personally denounced by Mao Zedong. In the People's Daily  Mao attacked Wu Xun as a liberal whose literacy programs implied that revolution was not necessary. The flurry of criticism that Mao's denunciation triggered was the "first major politico-ideological campaign" of the post-1949 revolution, and its effects were immediate. As a result, Sun Yu's reputation was soon in ruins, and his career effectively stalled. Sun Yu would go on to direct only a handful of titles over the next twenty years. In 1985, thirty-five years after the release of The Life of Wu Xun, members of the Chinese politburo finally admitted that Mao's campaign, and the criticisms that it instigated against the film, was essentially baseless.

Sun Yu died in Shanghai in 1990.

Selected filmography

Further reading
 Rea, Christopher. Chinese Film Classics, 1922-1949. New York: Columbia University Press, 2021.  
Sun, Yu [孫瑜], translation, introduction, and commentary (1982). Li Po-A New Translation 李白詩新譯. Hong Kong: The Commercial Press,

Notes

External links
 Chinese Film Classics: Sun Yu (chinesefilmclassics.org) - scholarly website based at the University of British Columbia with English-subtitled copies of and video lectures on several Sun Yu films, including Sports Queen and The Great Road, as well as biographical information

Sun Yu at the Chinese Movie Data base
Sun Yu and National Cinema
Biography

1900 births
1990 deaths
Film directors from Chongqing
Columbia University alumni
Tsinghua University alumni
University of Wisconsin–Madison College of Letters and Science alumni
Chinese film directors
Chinese silent film directors